Black Sunday refers to a particularly severe dust storm that occurred on April 14, 1935 as part of the Dust Bowl in the United States. It was one of the worst dust storms in American history and it caused immense economic and agricultural damage. It is estimated to have displaced 300 thousand tons of topsoil from the prairie area.

On the afternoon of April 14, residents of several plains states were forced to take cover as a dust storm or "black blizzard" blew through the region. The storm hit the Oklahoma panhandle and northwestern Oklahoma first, and moved south for the remainder of the day. It hit Beaver, Oklahoma around 4 p.m., Boise City around 5:15, and Amarillo, Texas at 7:20. The conditions were the most severe in the Oklahoma and  Texas panhandles, but the storm's effects were also felt in other surrounding areas. The combination of drought, erosion, bare soil, and winds caused the dust to fly freely and at high speeds.

The Dust Bowl 

The term "Dust Bowl" initially described a series of dust storms that hit the prairies of Canada and the United States during the 1930s. It now describes the area in the United States most affected by the storms, including western Kansas, eastern Colorado, northeastern New Mexico, and the Oklahoma and Texas panhandles. The "black blizzards" started in the eastern states in 1930, affecting agriculture from Maine to Arkansas. By 1934, they had reached the Great Plains, stretching from North Dakota to Texas and from the Mississippi River Valley to the Rocky Mountains. The Dust Bowl as an area received its name following the disastrous Black Sunday storm in April 1935 when reporter Robert E. Geiger referred to the region as "the Dust Bowl" in his account of the storm.

Causes 

Cattle farming and sheep ranching had left much of the west devoid of natural grass and shrubs to anchor the soil, and over-farming and poor soil stewardship left the soil dehydrated and lacking in organic matter.  A drought hit the United States in the 1930s, and the lack of rainfall, snowfall, and moisture in the air dried out the top soil in most of the country's farming regions.

Effects 
The destruction caused by the dust storms, and especially by the storm on Black Sunday, killed multiple people  and caused hundreds of thousands of people to relocate. Poor migrants from the American Southwest (known as "Okies" - though only about 20 percent were from Oklahoma) flooded California, overtaxing the state's health and employment infrastructure.

In 1935, after the massive damage caused by these storms, Congress passed the Soil Conservation Act, which established the Soil Conservation Service (SCS) as a permanent agency of the USDA. The SCS was created in an attempt to provide guidance for land owners and land users to reduce soil erosion, improve forest and field land and conserve and develop natural resources.  This led to the Great Plains Shelterbelt project.

Personal accounts of Black Sunday and other dust storms 
During the 1930s, many residents of the Dust Bowl kept accounts and journals of their lives and of the storms that hit their areas. Collections of accounts of the dust storms during the 1930s have been compiled over the years and are now available in book collections and online.

Lawrence Svobida was a wheat farmer in Kansas during the 1930s.  He experienced the period of dust storms, and the effect that they had on the surrounding environment and the society. His observations and feelings are available in his memoirs, Farming the Dust Bowl. Here he describes an approaching dust storm:

The Black Sunday storm is detailed in the 2012 Ken Burns PBS documentary The Dust Bowl.

In popular culture 

Musicians and songwriters began to reflect the Dust Bowl and the events of the 1930s in their music. Woody Guthrie, a singer-songwriter from Oklahoma, wrote a variety of songs documenting his experiences living during the era of dust storms. Several were collected in his first album Dust Bowl Ballads. One of them, Great Dust Storm, describes the events of Black Sunday.  An excerpt of the lyrics follows:

On the 14th day of April of 1935,
There struck the worst of dust storms that ever filled the sky.
You could see that dust storm comin', the cloud looked deathlike black,
And through our mighty nation, it left a dreadful track.
From Oklahoma City to the Arizona line,
Dakota and Nebraska to the lazy Rio Grande,
It fell across our city like a curtain of black rolled down,
We thought it was our judgement, we thought it was our doom.

References

Droughts in the United States
Dust storms
Weather hazards
Dust Bowl
1935 natural disasters in the United States
1935 in Texas
Natural disasters in Texas